Haresh Sapra is the Charles T. Horngren Professor of Accounting at the University of Chicago Booth School of Business specializing in the real effects of accounting disclosure and measurement rules. He is currently a senior editor of the Journal of Accounting Research.

Sapra is an applied theorist who is best known for his research on the impact of mark-to-market accounting on bank stability and the role of accounting conservatism on debt contracting.

Education
Sapra graduated from the University of Houston with a bachelor's degree in accounting in 1991. In 2000, he received a PhD in Business Administration from the University of Minnesota.

Career
Sapra has been a member of the faculty at the University of Chicago since 2000. He has been a visiting professor at Imperial College London. His current research focuses on the impact on loan loss provisioning models such as the Current Expected Credit Loss Model (CECL) on banking regulation.

References

External links 
 

University of Chicago Booth School of Business faculty
University of Houston alumni
Year of birth missing (living people)
Living people
Accounting academics